Jace Clark (born July 18, 2005) is an American soccer player who currently plays for Loudoun United FC in the USL Championship. Clark is committed to playing college soccer for the University of Maryland, College Park in 2023.

Career 
Clark began his youth soccer career playing for Baltimore Armour before transferring into the D.C. United Academy in 2018. In 2021, he signed a development contract with D.C. United's reserve team, Loudoun United FC. He made his Loudoun debut on September 26, 2021 in a 1–6 loss against Miami FC, playing in the entire second half of the match. On October 3, 2021, Clark scored his first professional goal, in a 1–5 loss against the Charlotte Independence. 

On November 29, 2021, Clark committed to playing collegiately for the Maryland Terrapins men's soccer program beginning in the fall of 2023.

Statistics

Club

References

External links 
 Jace Clark at TopDrawer Soccer

2005 births
Living people
Association football defenders

Loudoun United FC players
Soccer players from Baltimore
USL Championship players
American soccer players